Adnoun is a linguistic term used with two different meanings.

Hyponym of adjective

An adnoun is a kind of lexical category.  In English, it is a word that is usually an adjective, but is being used as a noun.  The origin of the word is thought to date to around 1763-1792. Often these usages are simply identified as the noun form of the word.

Examples:
 "guide-dogs for the blind", "blind" is an adnoun because it stands in for the noun phrase "blind people"
 "tax cuts for the rich", "rich" is an adnoun because it stands in for the noun phrase "rich people"

Synonym of adjective
Adnoun is an alternative term, which is considered to be archaic, for adjective. As John Eliot states in his 1666 Indian Grammar Begun..., "An Adnoun is a part of Speech that attendeth upon a Noun, and signifieth the Qualification thereof."

References

Syntactic entities
Parts of speech